Ninja Crusaders is a side-scrolling action game released by Sammy for the Nintendo Entertainment System in 1990. The player takes control of one of two ninjas who are tasked at thwarting an alien invasion. The game has been compared to Tecmo's Ninja Gaiden series.

Gameplay
Ninja Crusaders is a side-scrolling action game that can be played by up to two players simultaneously. There are four weapons  that player can pick up and use during the game: shuriken, kusarigama, bō and sword. Each weapon has its unique style and transformation ability: shuriken provides the ability of transforming into tiger, which is the fastest and can jump the highest but has the shortest range; kusarigama provides the ability of transforming into sea scorpion, which can swim better than all the rest but moves very slowly on land; bō provides the ability of transforming into falcon, which has the ability to fly above everything but cannot attack at all; and finally sword provides the ability of transforming into dragon, which can fly, is invincible, and kills everything in one hit, but the player can only use this ability only once and only for a limited amount of time, also sword itself rarely appears in the game.

Plot
In the near future, a force of alien invaders is wreaking havoc on Earth from the furthest reaches of outer space. This new menace was stronger than our most powerful defenses and proved to be unstoppable. In Japan, brave ninja warriors rose from the shadows to battle the alien invaders, but were eventually driven out as the menace took control of their homeland. Some of the ninjas escaped Japan and scattered to remote lands around the world. But their passion to reclaim their land and crush the enemy's rage. It was decided that two ninjas, Talon and Blade, would be sent to destroy the evil.

Reception
NES Player claims that the speed and unpredictability of the game's enemy character are what leads to the game's biggest downfall, level memorization, forcing players to over-rely on memorization in later stages.

Notes

References

External links
Ninja Crusaders at MobyGames
Ninja Crusaders at GameFAQs
Rom Pit review at Something Awful

1990 video games
Alien invasions in video games
Video games about ninja
Nintendo Entertainment System games
Nintendo Entertainment System-only games
NMK (company) games
Platform games
Post-apocalyptic video games
Science fiction video games
Video games developed in Japan
Multiplayer and single-player video games